Caimito is a town and municipality located in the Sucre Department, northern Colombia.

References
 Gobernacion de Sucre - Caimito
 Caimito official website

Sucre